Shamabad (also Romanized as Shamābād and Shemābād; also known as Shamsābād) is a village in Tabas Rural District, in the Central District of Khoshab County, Razavi Khorasan Province, Iran. At the 2006 census, its population was 572, in 165 families.

References 

Populated places in Khoshab County